The  is a Scouting Jamboree held by the Scout Association of Japan, and is the largest Scouting event in Japan. "Scout" was added to the name beginning in 2018.

Jamborees are held once every four years, and are abbreviated as "NJ", or including the number of the event, as (for example) 14NJ for the 14th Nippon Jamboree.

The first postwar all-Japan camp held to celebrate to reorganization of the Boy Scouts of Japan was held September 24–25, 1949 in Tokyo. The second All-Japan Camporee was held from August 18–20, 1950. The third All-Japan Camporee was held from August 4–6, 1951. Beginning with the fourth All-Japan Camporee, the name was changed to Nippon Jamboree.

Locations
 1st Nippon Jamboree August 2 to August 6, 1956, Karuizawa, Nagano Prefecture
 2nd Nippon Jamboree August 6 to August 10, 1959, Aibano, Shiga Prefecture
 3rd Nippon Jamboree August 3 to August 8, 1962, Gotenba, Shizuoka Prefecture
 4th Nippon Jamboree August 5 to August 9, 1966, Nihonbara, Okayama Prefecture
 5th Nippon Jamboree August 6 to August 10, 1970, Asagiri Plateau, Shizuoka Prefecture
 6th Nippon Jamboree August 1 to August 6, 1974, Chitosebara, Hokkaidō
 7th Nippon Jamboree August 4 to August 8, 1978, Gotenba, Shizuoka Prefecture
 8th Nippon Jamboree August 2 to August 6, 1982, Minami Zaō National Youth Campsite, Miyagi Prefecture
 9th Nippon Jamboree August 2 to August 6, 1986, Minami Zaō National Youth Campsite, Miyagi Prefecture
 10th Nippon Jamboree August 3 to August 7, 1990, Myōkō Plateau, Niigata Prefecture
 11th Nippon Jamboree August 3 to August 7, 1994, Kuju Plateau, Ōita Prefecture
 12th Nippon Jamboree August 3 to August 7, 1998, Foothills of Mount Moriyoshi, Akita Prefecture
 13th Nippon Jamboree August 3 to August 7, 2002, Maishima Sports Island, Osaka Prefecture
 14th Nippon Jamboree August 3 to August 7, 2006, Refresh Mura Hachigasaki, Suzu, Ishikawa Prefecture
 15th Nippon Jamboree August 1 to August 8, 2010 Asagiri Plateau, Shizuoka Prefecture
 16th Nippon Jamboree July 31 to August 7, 2013, Kirara Beach, Yamaguchi Prefecture, preparation for the 23rd World Scout Jamboree
 17th Nippon Scout Jamboree August 4 to August 10, 2018, Refresh Mura Hachigasaki, Suzu, Ishikawa Prefecture
 18th Nippon Scout Jamboree August 4 to August 10, 2022, 2 sites in Tokyo, one in Koto Ward, the other in Kawasaki

Other camping festivals

Scout Moots 
Rover Scouts and Scouts of the same age range can participate in these events. They are held once every four years.
Rover Moot 97 August 26 to August 31, 1997, Uwano Plateau, Hyōgo Prefecture
Moot 2001 August 7 to August 12, 2001, Shinshiro Yoshikawa Campsite, Aichi Prefecture
Scout Moot 2005 August 19 to August 24, 2005, Yamanaka Campsite, Yamanashi Prefecture

Nippon Agoonorees 

Participants in these events are mainly Scouts with disabilities. Agoonorees are held once every four years, and are abbreviated as "NA", or including the number of the event, as (for example) 9NA for the 9th Nippon Agoonoree.

 1st Nippon Agoonoree: August 8 to August 20, 1973, Aichi Youth Park, Aichi Prefecture
 2nd Nippon Agoonoree: July 30 to August 3, 1976, Aichi Youth Park, Aichi Prefecture
 3rd Nippon Agoonoree: August 3 to August 8, 1979 Nagai Park, Osaka
 4th Nippon Agoonoree: August 5 to August 9, 1983 Ureshinodai Lifelong Educational Center, Hyōgo Prefecture
 5th Nippon Agoonoree: July 31 to August 4, 1987 Chuo Youth House, Gotenba, Shizuoka Prefecture
 6th Nippon Agoonoree: July 25 to August 29, 1991 National Institution for Youth Education, Tokyo
 7th Nippon Agoonoree: July 26 to July 30, 1995 National Myogo Youth Outdoor Learning Center, Niigata Prefecture
 8th Nippon Agoonoree: August 5 to August 9, 1999, Outdoor Activity Center, Matsuyama, Ehime Prefecture
 9th Nippon Agoonoree: July 31 to August 4, 2003, Refresh Town Hachi-ga-saki, Suzu, Ishikawa Prefecture
 10th Nippon Agoonoree: July 31 to August 4, 2008 (It would have been held in 2007, but was moved to 2008 due to the World Scout Jamboree being held in 2007.) Happy Village, Kobe, Hyogo Prefecture
 11th Nippon Agoonoree: August 2 to August 6, 2012, Kibogaoka Culture Park, Shiga Prefecture
 12th Nippon Agoonoree: August 12 to August 16, 2016, Fuji Yamanomura, Fujimiya, Shizuoka Prefecture
 13th Nippon Agoonoree: August, 2020 Fukushima Prefecture

Venture Scout Festivals

Participants in these events are mainly Scouts of high school age (Venture Scouts, formerly Senior Scouts). These festivals are held once every four years, and have currently been held six times. They are abbreviated as "NV", or including the number of the event, as (for example) 6NV for the 6th Nippon Venture.

 1st Nippon Venture: July 27 to August 3, 1984, Foothills of Minami Zaō Range, Miyagi Prefecture
 2nd Nippon Venture: July 29 to August 5, 1988, Asagiri Plateau, Shizuoka Prefecture
 3rd Nippon Venture: August 3 to August 11, 1992, Aibano, Shiga Prefecture
 4th Nippon Venture: July 29 to August 4, 1996, Foothills of Mount Sanbe, Shimane Prefecture
 5th Nippon Venture: July 29 to August 4, 2000, Kusumi Plateau, Oita Prefecture
 6th Nippon Venture: August 2 to August 7, 2004, across the Kantō region

See also
Jamboree (Scouting)
World Jamboree

Sources 

Much of this article was translated from the original article in the Japanese Wikipedia, as retrieved on October 27, 2006.

References

Scouting in Japan
Scouting jamborees
Recurring events established in 1956
1956 establishments in Japan